Fusiturricula is a genus of sea snails, marine gastropod mollusks in the family Drilliidae.

Taxonomy
The genus Fusiturricula (together with Cruziturricula) forms an unsupported group that is sister clade  to Drilliidae in the cladogram of the molecular phylogeny of the Conoidea.. The type species of Fusiturricula, Turris fusinella Dall, 1908, is even different from what is currently conceived as belonging to that genus, but those species are similar to Cruziturricula sensu auctt.  Although Fusiturricula (and Cruziturricula) definitely do not belong in the family Drilliidae (they may represent a new family), they are assigned in the Drilliidae provisionally as a working hypothesis.

This genus is included in the family Cochlespiridae by the website gastropods.com

Species
Species within the genus Fusiturricula include:
 † Fusiturricula acra (Woodring, 1970) (synonym: Pleurofusia acra Woodring, 1970)
 Fusiturricula andrei McLean & Poorman, 1971
 Fusiturricula armilda (Dall, 1908)
 Fusiturricula bajanensis Nowell-Usticke, 1969
 Fusiturricula dolenta (Dall, 1908)
 Fusiturricula enae Bartsch, 1934
 Fusiturricula fenimorei (Bartsch, 1934)
 Fusiturricula fusinella (Dall, 1908)
 Fusiturricula humerosa (Gabb, 1873)
 Fusiturricula iole Woodring, 1928
 Fusiturricula jaquensis (Sowerby II, 1850)
 Fusiturricula lavinoides (Olsson, 1922)
 Fusiturricula maesae Rios, 1985
 Fusiturricula notilla (Dall, 1908) 
 † Fusiturricula panola Woodring 1928 
 Fusiturricula paulettae Princz 1978 (synonym: Knefastia paulettae);  Fusiturricula jaquensis (G.B. II Sowerby, 1850) )
 † Fusiturricula springvaleensis Mansfield 1925 (synonym:Turricula springvaleensis) 
 Fusiturricula sunderlandi Petuch, 1990
 Fusiturricula taurina (Olsson, 1922)
 † Fusiturricula yasila Olsson 1930 
Species brought into synonymy
 Fusiturricula altenai Macsotay and Campos 2001: synonym of † Fusiturricula springvaleensis Mansfield 1925
 Fusiturricula howelli Hertlein & Strong, 1951: synonym of  Knefastia howelli (Hertlein & Strong, 1951)

References

 W. P. Woodring. 1928. Miocene Molluscs from Bowden, Jamaica. Part 2: Gastropods and discussion of results . Contributions to the Geology and Palaeontology of the West Indies

External links
  Tucker, J.K. 2004 Catalog of recent and fossil turrids (Mollusca: Gastropoda). Zootaxa 682:1-1295
 WMSDB - Worldwide Mollusc Species Data Base: family Drilliidae

 
Gastropod genera